Charcot foot could mean:
 Charcot arthropathy in the foot, most commonly due to diabetic neuropathy
 The characteristic foot deformity of Charcot–Marie–Tooth disease(nb. As a neuropathy, this can eventually lead to Charcot arthropathy of the foot)